Aganoptila is a genus of moth in the family Cosmopterigidae.

Species
Aganoptila durata Meyrick, 1922
Aganoptila phanarcha Meyrick, 1915

References
Natural History Museum Lepidoptera genus database

Cosmopterigidae
Moth genera